Korbeek-Dijle is a village in the Belgian province Flemish Brabant and is part of the municipality of Bertem. Korbeek-Dijle is known because of its church, the Sint-Bartholomeuschurch (constructed in 1860). This church has been renovated in 1988-89.

Inside the church is a nice retable from 1522. It was created in a studio from Brussels and the side panels were painted by the artist Jan Vanden Couteren from Leuven. On these side panels you can find the history of the holy Stefanus, martyr. When the retable is closed, miraculous healings from the Middle Ages are visible.

The Ruwaal-walk, a signposted walk brings you to the nicest views of the village and sunken lanes. This walk starts at the church.

Populated places in Flemish Brabant